The Pectol-Works House, at 96 West 400 North in Manti, Utah, was listed on the National Register of Historic Places in 2019.

It was built in two phases, in 1851 and 1863.

See also
John Patten House, across the street, also NRHP-listed

References

		
National Register of Historic Places in Sanpete County, Utah
Houses completed in 1854
1854 establishments in Utah Territory